Themistokles Dudu Murorua (born 27 August 1958 in Okahandja, Otjozondjupa Region) is a Namibian politician. A member of the United Democratic Front, Murorua has been the governor of Kunene Region since 2005. From 1999 to 2005, Murorua was a member of the National Council of Namibia and at the time the only UDF member of that body. He represented the Kamanjab Constituency. For the 2019 parliamentary election Murorua was placed second on UDF's party list. As the party gained two seats in that election he joined the National Assembly of Namibia in March 2020.

Murorua is a Certified Public Accountant by profession, but has worked with numerous wildlife organisations including the Save the Rhino Trust.

Same-sex marriage
In 2003 while a member of the National Council, Murorua was shouted down by ruling SWAPO members for suggesting that same-sex couples in Namibia should be included in legislation fighting domestic violence.

References

1958 births
Living people
People from Okahandja
United Democratic Front (Namibia) politicians
Members of the National Council (Namibia)
Members of the National Assembly (Namibia)